Nanna Terese Blondell (born 6 August 1986) is a Swedish stage, television, and film actress.

Education
Blondell earned a degree from Stockholm Academy of Dramatic Arts. As a child she wanted to be an actress, but she didn't believe that there was a future for her in Sweden's entertainment industry as a black woman.

Career
Blondell made her on screen debut in the SVT drama series Livet enligt Rosa in 2005. After working for a while as a VJ with MTV Sweden she landed a role in an episode of police procedural Beck the following year, and a recurring role in soap opera Andra avenyn.

She raised her profile when she joined the cast of popular sci-fi drama Real Humans, a TV series that was exported around the world including the United Kingdom and France. 
She made her English language debut with Ø, an English-Language French TV series filmed in Denmark.

In 2018, she landed one of the roles in French feature film Soeurs d'armes (Sisters in Arms), inspired by a real military unit with female Kurdish, Yezidi and resistance fighters taking on ISIS, and was the only actress who did not speak any French. She portrayed an African-American sniper. 

She can also be seen in Immortal as Sha Dishi - the leader of nation of immortals. This was also an English language French production, and could be seen via the French streaming app Blackpills.

Blondell had the female co-lead in gritty crime drama Hassel alongside actor Ola Rapace, and Twin starring Kristofer Hivju.

In 2019, she announced on social media that she had a secret role in Marvel's Black Widow.

Her latest project is Red Dot, the first Netflix feature film from Sweden, co-starring Anastasios Soulis.

Since 2013, Blondell has been working at the Royal Dramatic Theatre.

Blondell debuted as the adult Laena Velaryon in episode six of the first season of HBO's House of the Dragon, the prequel show to the highly popular Game of Thrones.

Other
She runs the podcast Fenomenala kvinnor (Phenomenal Women), where she interviews successful Swedish non-white women.

In 2016, she made her directorial debut with the short film Noni & Elizabeth. This film was in official selection at LA Film Festival, Palm Springs ShortFest and Giffoni Film Festival.

Her agent is Finnish-Swedish talent manager Laura Munsterhjelm, the same agent as Swedish actresses Rebecca Ferguson and Academy Award winner Alicia Vikander.

Filmography

Film

Television

References

External links 

 

1986 births
Living people
21st-century Swedish actresses
Swedish stage actresses
Swedish film actresses
Place of birth missing (living people)
Swedish television hosts
Swedish women television presenters
Swedish people of Ghanaian descent